Holy Trinity Church, Bolton is a redundant Church of England parish church in Trinity Street, Bolton, Greater Manchester, England. It a Grade II listed building. It was a Commissioners' church, having received a grant towards its construction from the Church Building Commission.

History
Holy Trinity was designed by Philip Hardwick and built in 1823–25. A grant of £13,924 (equivalent to £ in ) was given towards its construction by the Church Building Commission. The church was declared redundant on 1 July 1993. The church was carefully restored and converted into an apartment building in 2014

Architecture

Exterior
The church is faced with ashlar stone and has slate roofs. It is a Gothic Revival building in Perpendicular style. It has a seven-bay nave, a shallow chancel with a vestry to the east, and a west tower.

The tower is in four stages with angle buttresses. It has a west doorway, above which is a pair of tiered windows. The third stage has clock dials, and in the top stage are three-light bell openings. On the summit are crocketed pinnacles at the corners and at the midpoint on each side.

The nave bays are separated by buttresses. These are topped by crocketed pinnacles, which are linked by an embattled parapet. In each bay is a three-light tiered window. The chancel has a lancet window on the north and south sides, and a nine-light east window.

Interior
Inside the church are galleries on three sides, the lateral galleries being carried on five-bay arcades. Both nave and chancel have vaulted ceilings. On each side of the chancel arch are paintings, one of which depicts the Nativity and the other the Ascension. Most of the fittings and furniture have been removed.

John Nicholson built the three-manual organ in 1860 for Manchester Cathedral. Jardine and Company moved the organ to Holy Trinity in 1874 and rebuilt it in 1905. Rushworth and Dreaper overhauled it in 1957 and 1960.

See also

List of Commissioners' churches in Northeast and Northwest England
Listed buildings in Bolton

References

Further reading

External links

19th-century Church of England church buildings
Anglican Diocese of Manchester
Church of England church buildings in Greater Manchester
Churches completed in 1825
Commissioners' church buildings
Former Church of England church buildings
Former churches in Greater Manchester
Grade II listed churches in the Metropolitan Borough of Bolton
Buildings and structures in Bolton